Henry Gordon Jago is a character who appeared in the 1977 Doctor Who television serial, The Talons of Weng-Chiang. He was played by Christopher Benjamin. He worked so well with Trevor Baxter's character, Professor George Litefoot, the production team briefly considered giving them their own spin-off series. In 2009 they reprised their roles for the Big Finish Productions audio drama, The Mahogany Murderers. This led to their own audio series, Jago & Litefoot.

Character history
In Victorian London, Henry Gordon Jago was the owner and Master of Ceremonies at The Palace Theatre, a position he held for over thirty years. Jago was a charismatic character, comically cowardly, categorically crowing, constantly cash crunched and always adept at ample amounts of aureate alliteration. In 1889, Jago employed a Chinese illusionist named Li H'sen Chang, who often used a ventriloquist dummy called Mr. Sin. Chang was actually serving a fugitive tyrant from the 51st Century named Magnus Greel and Mr. Sin was a psychopathic pig cyborg. With Sino assassins on the streets and women whisked away at whim, the theatre attracted the astute attention of the Fourth Doctor and his assistant Leela. It was while defeating these dastardly deliverers of deviltry, that Jago met upper class pathologist, Professor George Litefoot. The two remained close friends ever since, occasionally solving mysteries, including an adventure involving an anteater and an aluminum violin.

After a few years, Jago was forced to close his theatre and MC at a far less reputable establishment, The New Regency Theatre. He also spent a lot of time at a pub called the Red Tavern, befriending many of its denizens, including the barmaid, Ellie Higson. In 1892, Jago and Litefoot embarked in a spate of strange investigations of infernal incidents in the paranormal. Together, they saved the Empire from bloodsucking beasts, creeping cadavers, villainous vampires, sordid specters, psychotic scientists and ambulatory automatons. Often, Jago employed his knowledge of stage illusions and contacts with London's lower classes to solve their cases. Eventually, Jago came into the ownership of The New Regency Theatre, but his investigations with Professor Litefoot continued. In 1895, Leela joins Jago and Litefoot in several adventures. Leela had been sent by the Time Lords to discover the cause of fractures in time. Shortly before she returns to Gallifrey, the three of them are reunited with the Doctor, this time in his sixth incarnation. He and his TARDIS were being stalked by temporal aliens, so the Doctor went into hiding, wearing dark Victorian garb and calling himself Claudius Dark. After learning his true identity, Jago and Litefoot were invited by the Doctor to take a few trips in the TARDIS, starting with a visit to the planet Venus.

Appearances

Television
 The Talons of Weng-Chiang (with the Fourth Doctor)

Audio
 The Mahogany Murderers
 The Bloodless Soldier
 The Bellova Devil
 The Spirit Trap
 The Similarity Engine
 Litefoot and Sanders
 The Necropolis Express
 The Theatre of Dreams
 The Ruthven Inheritance
 Dead Men's Tales
 The Man at the End of the Garden
 Swan Song
 Chronoclasm
 Jago in Love (with the Sixth Doctor)
 Beautiful Things (with the Sixth Doctor)
 The Lonely Clock (with the Sixth Doctor)
 The Hourglass Killers (with the Sixth Doctor)
 Voyage to Venus (with the Sixth Doctor)
 Voyage to the New World (with the Sixth Doctor)
 The Age of Revolution
 The Case of the Gluttonus Guru
 The Bloodchild Codex
 The Final Act
 The Justice of Jalxar (with the Fourth Doctor)

References

External links
 Jago and Litefoot Audio Adventures

Recurring characters in Doctor Who
Doctor Who audio characters
Fictional people from London
Television characters introduced in 1977
Male characters in television